"Every Minute" is a song by Swedish singer Eric Saade. It was released on 27 February 2021 as the lead single from his upcoming sixth studio album. The song was written by Saade, Linnea Deb, Jimmy "Joker" Thörnfeldt, and Joy Deb, who also handled the production. On 27 February 2021, the song was performed in the fourth heat in Melodifestivalen 2021, where it made it through to the final on 13 March 2021. He finished second overall in the Melodifestivalen final, while Tusse qualified to represent Sweden in Eurovision Song Contest 2021.

"Every Minute" peaked at number four in Sweden, becoming Saade's best-charting song in ten years, since "Hearts in the Air" peaked at number two in the country.

Track listing
Digital download
 "Every Minute" – 3:02

Digital download - Acoustic Version
 "Every Minute" (Acoustic Version) (featuring STO CULTR) - 3:54

Charts

Weekly charts

Year-end charts

References

2021 songs
2021 singles
English-language Swedish songs
Eric Saade songs
Melodifestivalen songs of 2021
Songs written by Eric Saade
Songs written by Jimmy Thörnfeldt
Songs written by Joy Deb
Songs written by Linnea Deb